Butternut Square was a Canadian children's television series which aired on CBC Television between October 19, 1964 and February 10, 1967. The cast featured Ernie Coombs as Mr. Dressup, whose own landmark television series began production  after Butternut Square's run had ended. The show was broadcast in black and white, and originally was 20 minutes until the final season, when it was expanded to a full 30 minutes.

Following Butternut Square's cancellation, Mr. Dressup would get his own series, in the fall of 1967. Two puppets from Butternut Square, Casey and Finnegan would also join him on that new series, which would run until 1996.

Other cast
 Sandra Cohen as Sandy (1964)
 Donald Himes as The Music Man (1964–1965)
 Robert Jeffrey as Bob (1965–1967)
 Judith Lawrence as Casey/Finnegan/Alexander/Miranda/Mrs. Trapeze (voice)

References

External links
 
 Memorable TV Guide
 Queen's University Directory of CBC Television Series (Butternut Square archived listing link via archive.org)

1960s Canadian children's television series
1964 Canadian television series debuts
1967 Canadian television series endings
Black-and-white Canadian television shows
Canadian television shows featuring puppetry
CBC Television original programming